Srinivasa Gowda is an Indian Kambala jockey from Mudbidri, Karnataka. He is also known as Indian Usain Bolt, Gowda came into limelight after his Kambala sprint broke Usain Bolt's world record in hundred meters. Gowda reportedly ran 142.5 metres in 13.62 seconds along with his racing buffalo pair.

Recognition 
Sports Minister Kiren Rijiju offered to arrange trials for Gowda on behalf of Sports Authority of India. The minister also promised to arrange training for Gowda by SAI coaches. He was given a cheque of Rs 3 lakh by Karnataka chief minister. However, Gowda refused to go for Sports Authority of India trials because Kambala is an altogether different sports from on-track sprint.

Aftermath 
Gowda said that he will start training with SAI only after the Kambala season is over.

References 

People from Karnataka
Living people
Indian male sprinters
1991 births